Mount McCaleb is an  mountain summit located in Custer County, Idaho, United States.

Description
Mount McCaleb ranks as the 33rd-highest peak in Idaho and is part of the Lost River Range which is a subset of the Rocky Mountains. The mountain is set on land managed by Salmon–Challis National Forest and the peak overlooks the town of Mackay which is situated 6.5 miles south of the peak. Neighbors include Mount Breitenbach, 6.6 miles to the northwest, line parent USGS Peak 1.6 mile to the northeast, and Borah Peak, the highest peak in Idaho, is 13 miles to the northwest. Precipitation runoff from the mountain's slopes drains to Big Lost River.

Etymology
This mountain's toponym has been officially adopted by the United States Board on Geographic Names. The name honors Jesse McCaleb (1837–1878), heroic pioneer, merchant from Challis, and business associate of George L. Shoup. Jesse McCaleb was killed August 11, 1878, during an attack by Indians north of Mackay below this mountain which now bears his name.

Climate
Based on the Köppen climate classification, Mt. McCaleb is located in an alpine subarctic climate zone with long, cold, snowy winters, and cool to warm summers. Winter temperatures can drop below −10 °F with wind chill factors below −30 °F.

Gallery

See also
 List of mountain peaks of Idaho

References

External links
 Mount McCaleb: weather forecast
 Mount McCaleb: Idaho: A Climbing Guide
 Jesse McCaleb: biography and image
 Mount McCaleb (photo): Flickr

Mountains of Idaho
Mountains of Custer County, Idaho
North American 3000 m summits
Salmon-Challis National Forest